CVSA may stand for:
 Computerized Voice Stress Analysis 
 Commercial Vehicle Safety Alliance